is a railway station on the Hakone Tozan Line located in Odawara, Kanagawa Prefecture, Japan. It is 3.2 rail kilometers from the line's terminus at Odawara Station.

History
Kazamatsuri Station was opened on 10 October 1935, when the Hakone Tozan Railway (founded 1928) changed its tram line, Odawawa - Hakone-Yumoto, to a railway. The station was completely reconstructed in 2007–2008.

Station numbering was introduced in January 2014 with Kazamatsuri being assigned station number OH49.

Lines
Hakone Tozan Railway
Hakone Tozan Line

Building
Kazamatsuri Station previously had a single island platform, but this was replaced with two opposed side platforms in its 2007-2008 reconstruction.

Platforms

Bus services
Hakone Tozan Bus
"H" line for Hakone Machi Ko (Lake Ashi) via Hakone Yumoto Station, Miyanoshita, Kowakidani Station, Kowaki-en, Moto Hakone Ko (Hakone Shrine), Hakone Checkpoint
"T" line for Togendai (Lake Ashi) via Hakone Yumoto Station, Miyanoshita, Sengoku (transfer for JR Gotemba Station & Gotemba Premium Outlets)
for Odawara Station
Izu Hakone Bus
"J" & "Z" lines for Hakone Checkpoint (Lake Ashi) via Hakone Yumoto Station, Miyanoshita, Kowakidani Station, Kowaki-en, Moto Hakone (Hakone Shrine), Kojiri
for Odawara Station

References

External links
 Hakone Tozan Railway Official Site
 Hakone Tozan Bus Official Site

Railway stations in Japan opened in 1935
Railway stations in Odawara
Railway stations in Kanagawa Prefecture